is a district located in Niigata Prefecture, Japan.

As of July 1, 2019, the district has an estimated population of 7,926 and a density of 22.2 persons per km2. The total area is 357.29 km2.

Towns and villages 
The district consists of one town:

 Yuzawa

History

Recent mergers 
 On November 1, 2004 - The towns of Muika and Yamato were merged to form the city of Minamiuonuma.
 On October 1, 2005 - The town of Shiozawa was also merged into expanded city of Minamiuonuma.

Districts in Niigata Prefecture